The Representation of the People Act, 1951 is an act of Parliament of India to provide for the conduct of election of the Houses of Parliament and to the House or Houses of the Legislature of each State, the qualifications and disqualifications for membership of those Houses, the corrupt practices and other offences at or in connection with such elections and the decision of doubts and disputes arising out of or in connection with such elections. It  was introduced in Parliament by law minister Dr. B.R. Ambedkar. The Act was enacted by the provisional parliament under Article 327 of Indian Constitution, before the first general election.

Background
An elected constituent assembly was set up on 9 December 1946  to frame the constitution. Most of the articles of the constitution came into force on 26 January 1950, commonly known as the Republic Day. Part XXI of the constitution contained the transitional provisions. Articles 379 and 394 of Part XXI which contained provisions for provisional parliament and other articles which contained provisions like citizenship, came into force on 26 November 1949, the date on which the constitution was adopted. The provisional parliament enacted the Act vide Act No.43 of 1951 for the first general election conducted on 25 October 1951. The basic qualification to represent the people is Indian citizenship and not disqualified to vote under section 16 of the Representation of People Act, 1950 read with Part II and VII of this act.

Amendments
The act has been amended several times, but some of the notable amendments include
 the Representation of the People (Amendment) Act, 1966 (47 of 1966), which abolished the election tribunals and transferred the election petitions to the high courts whose orders can be appealed to Supreme Court. However, election disputes regarding the election of President and Vice-President are directly heard by the Supreme Court.
 the Representation of the People (Amendment and Validation) Act, 2013 (29 of 2013)

The Representation of the People (Amendment) Bill, 2016 was introduced by Varun Gandhi in Lok Sabha.

Application to
Registration of political parties is governed by the provisions of section 29A of this Act.

President
Supreme Court shall inquire and decide & regarding doubts and disputes arising out of or in connection with the election of a President per Article 71(1) of the constitution. Subject to Article 71 (3), Parliament made applicable rules/procedure to petition the Supreme Court for resolving the disputes only that arise during the election process of the president but not the doubts that arise from his unconstitutional actions/deeds or changing Indian citizenship during the tenure of president which may violate the requisite election qualifications. Subject to the provisions of Prevention of Insults to National Honour Act, 1971, Supreme Court can remove the president for ceasing to possess the eligible qualifications to be Lok Sabha member under Sections 7 & 8(k) of this Act when the acts/ deeds (i.e. for giving assent to unconstitutional bills passed by the parliament or state legislatives, permitting the gazette notification of the unconstitutional  advises {including promulgation of ordinances under Article 123 or imposing president rules in a state under Article 356} rendered by the union cabinet / prime minister, etc.) of the president are proclaimed by the courts as unconstitutional, mala fide, ultra vires, void, etc. Also it is the duty of the Supreme Court to clarify any doubt in connection with the election of president such as speedy trail of the pending cases against an elected president before the elevation to president. The scope of the trail would be limited only to decide whether the incumbent president is eligible to continue in his post but not to prosecute the president under criminal charges with arrest and imprisonment or to claim relief in a civil case to comply with the provisions per Article 361 of the constitution.

Vice president
Similar to the president per article 71 upon ceasing to possess the requisite qualifications to be a member of Rajya Sabha subject to this Act. All pending criminal / corruption cases are to be disposed on priority by the Supreme court to decide whether he is qualified to continue as vice president

Prime minister

 Upon ceasing to possess the requisite qualifications to be a member of Parliament subject to this Act.

Speaker
Speaker of the Lok Sabha is also removed on getting disqualified for being Lok Sabha member under sections 7 & 8 of this Act. This would arise out of speaker's wrong certification of a bill as money bill inconsistent with the definition given in Articles 110 of the constitution. When courts upheld the unconstitutional act of the speaker for wrong certification of a bill as money bill, it amounts to disrespecting the constitution deserving conviction under Prevention of Insults to National Honour Act, 1971 which is applicable for disqualification of speaker's Lok Sabha membership under sections 7 & 8k of this Act.

Supreme court rulings and RPA

The Constitution of India – which empowers the Parliament of India to make laws regarding disqualification of MP and MLA- also mentions that on disqualification of an MP or an MLA, the seat becomes vacant immediately. Interpreting the words of constitution the bench found the clause 8(4) of the RPA act -which gives a time period of 3 months to file an appeal and allows continuation in office till its disposal- as unconstitutional. The Cabinet of Ministers, in order to nullify the judgement, passed an ordinance for the amendment of the act, however the said Ordinance wasn't signed by the President and it was taken back. A recent verdict on  19 November 2013 ensured the stay on the election campaigning of the convicted legislators for the current session.

Office of profit
Being public servants, elected representatives, MLAs or MPs, cannot hold an office of profit under section 9 (A) of the Representation of People's Act and Articles 102 and 191(E) of the Constitution.

In the year 2006, Sonia Gandhi resigned her membership of Lok Sabha for enjoying office of profit while being an MP. In 2006, Sonia Gandhi's ruling party in Parliament also amended the Parliament (Prevention of disqualification) Act, 1959 with retrospective effect from 4 April 1959 to prevent her punishable under the representation of the people Act, 1951 and Prevention of Insults to National Honour Act, 1971.

Some notable cases and instances
 Former Prime Minister Manmohan Singh had announced that the government had issued notifications for registration of overseas Indian electors under the Representation of People Act, 1950 to enable Indians resident abroad to participate in elections.
 Former state cabinet minister, Jagir Kaur, was booked under Section 123 of the act for bribing voters after the police seized 183 cases of liquor from the vehicles.
 The Allahabad high court invalidated found Indira Gandhi, who was the then Prime Minister, guilty on the charge of misuse of government machinery for her election campaign. The court declared her election null and void and unseated her from her seat in the Lok Sabha representing Rae Bareilly constituency. The court also banned her from contesting any election for an additional six years. This resulted in declaration of  emergency and amendments were made in the constitution to validate the election.
 Umlesh Yadav is the first politician to be disqualified by the Election Commission of India for a period of three years for suppression of her election expenses incurred when she was elected as an MLA to the Bisauli constituency in the 2007 Uttar Pradesh state assembly elections.
 Two Uttar Pradesh Legislative Assembly members, Bajrang Bahadur Singh and Uma Shankar Singh, were disqualified in January 2015 due to holding government contracts.
 As part of the disproportionate assets case against Jayalalithaa, she became in 2014 the first Chief Minister to be disqualified from office.
Madhya Pradesh Cabinet Minister Narottam Mishra disqualified for three years by Election commission of India for providing wrong information to EC on expenses incurred during the polls under section 10A of the Representation of the People Act, 1951, to be read with Sections 77 and 78 of the Act.

Provisions
The Act allows cash donations of any amount but it states in section 29C that any contributions above  to political parties are to be reported.

See also
 Rajya Sabha
Representation of the People Act
 MPID Act

References

Election law in India